The Gardiner Railroad Station is a historic former railroad station at 51 Maine Street in Gardiner, Maine. It was built in 1911 by the Maine Central Railroad, and was in use as a station until the 1950s.  It has since seen a variety of adaptive commercial uses.  A distinctive example of Romanesque architecture, it was added to the National Register of Historic Places on October 29, 1982.

Description and history

The former Gardiner Railroad Station stands in downtown Gardiner, between Maine Street and the Kennebec River, just north of the mouth of Cobbosseecontee Stream.  It is a single-story masonry structure, built of stone and brick, and set on a full-height granite basement.  It is roughly in the shape of an H, with projecting end wings, and a complex hipped roof line.  The roof has extended eaves with exposed rafters, and the central roof section has gabled dormers.  The building corners and window openings are quoined in smooth granite, while the basement level is of rough-cut granite, which transitions to smooth stone up to the sills of the first-floor windows.

The station was built in 1911 to a design by Portland architect George Burnham.  It replaced Gardiner's first station, which had been built just to the south when service was inaugurated to the city in 1852.  It is one of the state's most architecturally distinguished surviving railroad stations.

See also
National Register of Historic Places listings in Kennebec County, Maine

References

Railway stations on the National Register of Historic Places in Maine
Railway stations in the United States opened in 1911
Buildings and structures in Gardiner, Maine
Transportation buildings and structures in Kennebec County, Maine
National Register of Historic Places in Kennebec County, Maine
Former railway stations in Maine